Adinarayana K L  is an Indian politician, belonging to Telugu Desam Party. In the 2014 election he was elected to the ZPTC from the Hindupur Mandal in Andhra Pradesh.

References

1969 births
Living people
Telugu Desam Party politicians